Philip von Wörndle (9 July 1755 to 2 August 1818) was a Tyrolese commander against Napoleon.

Von Wörndle was born in Hotting and received his Doctor of Law degree from the University of Innsbruck in 1779.

Awards
Von Wörndle received the Tyrolese commemorative medal and the gold imperial medal for his defense of the Puster Valley during the War of the Fifth Coalition.

References

Military personnel from Innsbruck
Austrian Empire commanders of the Napoleonic Wars
1755 births
1818 deaths